Congo vivo is a 1962 Italian film. It stars actor Gabriele Ferzetti and Jean Seberg.

References

External links

1962 films
1962 drama films
Italian drama films
1960s Italian-language films
Films about journalists
Films set in the Democratic Republic of the Congo
1960s Italian films